Breugel is a village in the Dutch province of North Brabant, in the municipality of Son en Breugel.

Breugel lies east of the river Dommel and north of the Wilhelmina Canal.

History 
The village was first mentioned in 1288 as Brogele, and means "enclosed area".

The St Genoveva Church dates from the 15th century. In 1821, a much smaller tower built. It was renovated in 1960 and 1978.

Breugel was home to 335 people in 1840.

Gallery

References

Populated places in North Brabant
Son en Breugel
Pieter Bruegel the Elder